Barbara fulgens, the lustrous spruce cone moth, is a moth of the family Tortricidae. It is found in north-eastern China (Heilongjiang province) and eastern Russia (Khabarovsk Krai).

The wingspan is 14–17 mm. Adults are on wing in March.

The larvae feed on Picea koraiensis and Picea sibiricus. It is a pest of Korean spruce in the Heilongjiang province in China, with the larvae destroying the cones of their host plant.

References

External links
Eurasian Tortricidae

Olethreutinae
Moths described in 1969